Eugène Piot (11 November 1812 - 17 January 1890) was a French journalist, art critic, art collector and photographer. His pen name was  Nemo. 

Piot was born in Paris.

References

Art collectors from Paris
French art critics
19th-century French photographers
19th-century French journalists
Journalists from Paris
1812 births
1890 deaths